Sybil Christopher (née Williams; 27 March 1929 – 7 March 2013), formerly known as Sybil Burton, was a Welsh actress, theatre director, and founder of popular celebrity New York nightclub "Arthur".  She came into the public eye as the first wife of Richard Burton.

Biography
Sybil Williams was born on 27 March 1929, in Tylorstown, Mid Glamorgan. She attended the London Academy of Dramatic Arts (LAMDA), meeting Richard Burton during the filming of The Last Days of Dolwyn (1949). After their marriage, she retired from acting, performing only a few times, and generally on stage rather than on film. The marriage ended famously in 1963, when Burton began a liaison with Elizabeth Taylor. She divorced Burton in 1963 on grounds of "abandonment and cruel and inhumane treatment", receiving a $1 million settlement and custody of their children.

In 1965, Burton founded a nightclub in Manhattan at 154 East 54th Street, the site of El Morocco; numerous celebrities and well-known artists contributed, including Julie Andrews, Leonard Bernstein, Roddy McDowall, and Stephen Sondheim. "Arthur", as the club was known, (the precursor to Studio 54) became a popular nightclub for celebrities during its short tenure (1965–69). Frequent habitués included Truman Capote, Wilt Chamberlain, Roger Daltrey, Princess Margaret, Rudolph Nureyev, Lee Remick, Andy Warhol, Angela Lansbury and Tennessee Williams. D.J. Terry Noel claimed to have invented "mixing" in the club, layering music from two separate turntables.

Christopher then returned to theatre, founding the New Theatre on 54th Street in New York, and Bay Street Theater in Sag Harbor in 1991.

Family
Christopher had two daughters with Richard Burton, Katherine "Kate" Burton (born 10 September 1957) and Jessica Burton (born 1959). In 1965 in Manhattan, New York City she married Jordan Christopher, a singer and actor, and the couple raised his daughter and had another child, Amy Christopher (born May 1967).

Notes

 According to The New York Times, Sybil Christopher died on Thursday previous to the article's publication, meaning March 7. However, The Hollywood Reporter and The London Guardian reports she died on March 9.

References

Further reading
 Nora Ephron (1966), The New York Post 
 Time magazine, 14 May 1965. Brewster, B., Broughton, F..Last Night a Disc Jockey Saved My Life, Grove Press, 2000, pp. 62 – 64.

External links
 
 

1929 births
2013 deaths
British expatriate actresses in the United States
American theatre managers and producers
Nightclub owners
Welsh film actresses
Welsh stage actresses
People from Tylorstown
Alumni of the London Academy of Music and Dramatic Art
Place of death missing
20th-century Welsh actresses